The 2001 Arlington mayoral election was held on May 5, 2001 to elect the mayor of Arlington, Texas. The election was officially nonpartisan. It saw the reelection of incumbent mayor Elzie Odom.

If no candidate had obtained a majority of the vote, a runoff would have been held.

Results

References

Arlington mayoral
Arlington
2001
Non-partisan elections